A frog is a member of a diverse group of amphibians composing the order Anura.

Frog(s) or The Frog(s) may also refer to:

Businesses and organizations
 Frog (models), a brand of model aircraft
 The Frogs (club), a twentieth century African American theatrical organization
 Frog Design (stylized 'frog, part of Capgemini Invent'), a design firm founded in 1969
 Frog Mobile, a pre-paid mobile service in Greece, Bulgaria and Romania

People
 Frog Fagan (1940–1993), NASCAR Winston Cup driver
 Frog Pocket, recording name of John Charles Wilson, a Scottish musician
 Frog Redus (1905–1979), American baseball infielder in the Negro leagues
 The Frog, a ring name of Canadian All Star Wrestling professional wrestler Terry Tomko

Arts and entertainment

Games
 Frog (American card game), a card game of the German Tarok family
 Frog (patience), a patience or solitaire card game
 Frogs (video game), a 1978 single-player action arcade game
 Frogger, a 1981 single-player action arcade game

Literature
 Frog (picture books), a series of picture books by Max Velthuijs
 Frog (novel), a 2009 novel by Mo Yan
 Frog, a 1991 novel by Stephen Dixon
 The Frogs, a play by Aristophanes

Fictional characters
 Frog (Chrono Trigger), a video game character
 Crazy Frog, a computer-animated character
 Michigan J. Frog, a Merrie Melodies cartoon character
 One of the title characters in the Frog and Toad children's book series
 Frog, handle of the Smokey and the Bandit character Carrie, played by Sally Field
 Frogs, an alien species from German science-fiction series Raumpatrouille – Die phantastischen Abenteuer des Raumschiffes Orion
 Frog, one of the main characters in the TV series WordWorld

Music
 The Frogs (album), a 1988 album by The Frogs
 Frog (album), a 2002 album by Merzbow
 Frogs (song), by Alice in Chains
 The Frogs (band), an American rock music band founded in 1980
 The Frogs (musical), a 1974 musical adaptation of Aristophanes' play
 Frog Records, a UK classic jazz record label
 Bow frog, a block which holds the hair at the grip end of a string instrument's bow

Film and television
 Frog (film), a 1987 television film starring Shelley Duvall and Elliott Gould
 "Frogs!", a 1993 film sequel to Frog (film).
 Frogs (film), a 1972 horror film directed by George McCowan
 "Frogs", an episode of the television series Teletubbies
 The Frog, a 1937 film starring Noah Beery, Jack Hawkins and Gordon Harker
 The Frog (TV series), a 2020 Iranian series directed by Houman Seyyedi
 "The Frog", a metonym for The WB television network

Science and technology
 FROG, a block cipher in cryptography
 Fast and Realistic OpenGL Displayer, a toolkit for physics data visualisation
 Frequency-resolved optical gating, a method for measuring ultra-fast laser pulses

Military
 Flame Resistant Organizational Gear (FROG), flame resistant clothing developed for the US Marine Corps  
 FROG-3 and FROG-5, NATO reporting name for the 2K6 Luna, a Soviet short-range artillery rocket system
 FROG-7, NATO reporting name for the 9K52 Luna-M, a Soviet short-range artillery rocket system
 Matilda Frog, an Australian flamethrower variant of the British Second World War Matilda II tank

Geography
 Frog, Texas, an unincorporated community
 Frog Creek (West Virginia)
 Frog Lake (disambiguation)
 Frog Mountain, a mountain in Alabama

Railroads
 The point where two rails cross in a railroad switch
 Rerail frog, a ramp device - see Glossary of rail terminology

Tool parts
 An indentation in a brick
 Part of a mouldboard plough
 Part of a plane (tool)
 Part of a sheath or scabbard for an edged tool or weapon; see

Other uses
 Frog (dinghy), small dinghy
 Frog (fastening), ornamental braiding for the front of a garment
 Frog (horse anatomy), part of a horse's hoof
Frog (pejorative), an ethnic slur for French or French-Canadian people
 Folding bicycle produced by Riese und Müller
 In genetics, "the frog" generally refers to Xenopus laevis
 The act of ripping out stitches in knitting

See also 

 Frogman, a type of scuba diver
 Frog shark, a species of shark
 Toads and Frogs
 Frog and Toad
 
 
 FRG (disambiguation)
 Frogger (disambiguation)
 Frogging (disambiguation)
 Salientia, the clade for frogs, toads, proto-frogs
 Toad (disambiguation)

Lists of people by nickname